Walder Alves Souto Amado, known as Ronny (born 7 December 1978) is a Cape Verdean footballer who plays professionally in for CS Fola Esch. He previously played in Cape Verde for SC Praia and in Luxembourg for CS Oberkorn and F91 Dudelange.

International career
He received a call-up against Luxembourg in May 2008 to prepare for the 2010 FIFA World Cup qualification, in which he played all 6 qualifying matches. He was named to the Cape Verde squad for the 2013 Africa Cup of Nations.
He retired from international football after his participation at the 2013 Africa Cup of Nations.

References

External links

1978 births
Living people
Sportspeople from Praia
Cape Verdean footballers
Cape Verde international footballers
2013 Africa Cup of Nations players
Sporting Clube da Praia players
Santiago South Premier Division players
Cape Verdean National Championships players
CS Oberkorn players
F91 Dudelange players
CS Fola Esch players
Association football defenders